The Atwater-Stone House is a historic house located at 29 Water Street in Westfield, Chautauqua County, New York.

Description and history 
It is a -story, wood-framed dwelling, originally built in about 1812 and expanded in 1850.

It was listed on the National Register of Historic Places on December 16, 1983.

References

Houses on the National Register of Historic Places in New York (state)
Houses completed in 1812
Houses in Chautauqua County, New York
National Register of Historic Places in Chautauqua County, New York